Frank Jack Fletcher (April 29, 1885 – April 25, 1973) was an admiral in the United States Navy during World War II. Fletcher commanded five different task forces through WWII; he was the operational task force commander at the pivotal battles of the Coral Sea and Midway, which collectively resulted in the sinking of five Japanese fleet carriers.

In 1914, then Lieutenant Fletcher was awarded the Medal of Honor for his actions in the battle at Veracruz. He was the nephew of Admiral Frank Friday Fletcher, who was also awarded the Medal of Honor for actions at Veracruz.

Early life and early Navy career
Fletcher was born in Marshalltown, Iowa, on April 29, 1885. Appointed to the US Naval Academy from his native state in 1902, he graduated from Annapolis on February 12, 1906, served two years at sea, then required by law, and commissioned as an Ensign on February 13, 1908. His classmates included Arthur L. Bristol, William L. Calhoun, William A. Glassford, Charles C. Hartigan, Aubrey W. Fitch, Robert L. Ghormley, Isaac C. Kidd, John S. McCain Sr., Leigh Noyes, Ferdinand L. Reichmuth, Raymond A. Spruance, John H. Towers, Russell Willson, and Thomas Withers.

In November 1909, he was assigned to the destroyer , operating as part of the Asiatic Torpedo Flotilla. Fletcher assumed command of the destroyer  in April 1910, and in March 1912, he returned to Chauncey as her commanding officer. In December 1912, he was transferred to the battleship . In April 1914, on board Florida, the flagship of his uncle Frank Friday Fletcher, during the occupation of Veracruz, Mexico. He was awarded the Medal of Honor for the rescue of refugees on the transport Esperanza.

Detached from Florida in July 1914, he served briefly in Tennessee before reporting as Aide and Flag Lieutenant on the staff of the Commander in Chief, US Atlantic Fleet in July 1914. After a year at this post, he returned to the Naval Academy for duty in the Executive Department.

World War I and post-war period
He took command of the destroyer  in May 1918, receiving the Navy Cross for leading her through "important, exacting and hazardous duty".

From October 1918 to February 1919, he assisted in fitting out the destroyer , but was detached before her commissioning. He was relieved of that command in April 1919. Returning to Washington, he was head of the Detail Section, Enlisted Personnel Division in the Bureau of Navigation until September 1922.

Interwar service
Returning to the United States, he served at the Washington Navy Yards from March 1925 to 1927; became executive officer of the battleship ; and completed the Senior Course at the Naval War College, Newport in 1929–30, followed immediately by the Army War College in Washington, D.C., 1930–31, in preparation for strategic leadership responsibilities.

Fletcher became chief of staff to the Commander in Chief, US Asiatic Fleet in August 1931. In the summer of 1933, he was transferred to the Office of the Chief of Naval Operations. Following this assignment he had duty from November 1933 to May 1936, as aide to the Secretary of the Navy, the Honorable Claude A. Swanson.

He assumed command of the battleship , flagship of Battleship Division Three, in June 1936. In December 1937, he became a member of the Naval Examining Board, and became Assistant Chief of Bureau of Navigation in June 1938. In November 1939, Fletcher was promoted to Flag Rank, Rear Admiral, and Commander Cruiser Division Three (Light Cruisers). In June 1940, RAdm Fletcher was placed in command of Cruiser Division Six (Heavy Cruisers), the position he held on December 7, 1941. RAdm Fletcher was scheduled to become Commander, Cruisers, Scouting Force, in administrative charge of all Heavy Cruisers but the events of December 7 changed those plans.>

World War II

Pearl Harbor
RADM Fletcher was serving as Commander Cruiser Division Six and at sea when the Japanese attacked the Naval Base at Pearl Harbor on December 7, 1941. Admiral Kimmel, CinC PAC, thought enough of RADM Fletcher to put his name third on a short list of potential successors, if necessary.  According to RADM Thomas Kincaid, although RADM Fletcher was scheduled to become Commander, Cruisers, Scouting Force, Admiral Kimmel postponed these changes in order to place RADM Fletcher in command of the Wake Island relief Task Force.

Wake Island: December 8–23, 1941
Prior to December 7, Wake Island had received reinforcements, including aircraft for defense. At the time of Pearl Harbor, it was under the command of Commander Winfield Scott Cunningham, USN and included a Marine Corps Defense Battalion, commanded by Major James Devereux. A day after Pearl Harbor, reports were received from Wake Island of a Japanese bombardment and subsequent invasion attempt. Admiral Kimmel expected Wake Island to hold out in the short run and on December 10, CinC PAC drafted an Operations Order for the relief of Wake.  On December 15, Admiral Kimmel placed RAdm Fletcher in command of Task Force (TF) 14 for the relief of Wake which consisted of the fleet carrier , the fleet oiler , the seaplane tender , three heavy cruisers, and eight destroyers.  RAdm Fletcher commanded Task Force 14 from the cruiser Astoria while RAdm Aubrey Fitch sailed aboard Saratoga.  Unfortunate events caused a delay in departure of TF 14 as well as a delay in D-Day, the date of the actual relief effort.  TF 14 traveled West towards Wake Island at less than 13 knots, as fast as the slowest ship could travel, with plans to arrive at Wake Island on December 24 (D-Day).  Fletcher had been instructed to fuel prior to arriving at Wake Island.  Underway refueling was still a work in progress which took time and required calm sea conditions.

However certain events took place that had a drastic impact on the relief effort.  The primary event was the relief of Admiral Kimmel as CinC PAC, to be replaced by Admiral Chester Nimitz.  Since Nimitz was in Washington, D.C., VAdm William Pye assumed the duties of CinC PAC on December 17, until Nimitz's arrival.  Pye brought in personnel from his staff (he commanded the Pacific Fleet Battleships) and debates began regarding the intelligence information being provided, primarily whether the Japanese Navy had moved aircraft carriers to Wake in support their invasion.  On December 22, the Japanese began another invasion attempt of Wake. Given the new invasion and a lack of understanding regarding disposition of Japanese naval forces in the area, Pye ordered TF 14 to return to Pearl Harbor on December 22, thus abandoning the relief effort.  Fletcher obeyed the recall orders and returned TF 14 to Pearl Harbor and on the return trip, the equipment loaded on the Tangier was delivered to Midway Island.

January–April 1942
On January 1, 1942, Fletcher took command of Task Force 17 built around the carrier . Although a surface fleet admiral, he was chosen over more senior officers to lead a carrier task force. He learned air operations on the job while escorting troops to the South Pacific. He was junior TF commander under tutelage of the experts: Vice Admiral William Halsey during the Marshalls-Gilberts raids in February; Vice Admiral Wilson Brown attacking the enemy landings on New Guinea in March; and had aviation expert Rear Admiral Aubrey Fitch with him during the first Battle of the Coral Sea.

On April 19, 1942, Fletcher was designated Commander Cruisers, Pacific Fleet, with additional duty as Commander Cruiser Division Four.

Coral Sea: May 4–8, 1942

In May 1942, Fletcher commanded the task forces during the battle of the Coral Sea. This battle is famous as the first carrier-on-carrier battle fought between fleets that never came within sight of each other. Fletcher finished refueling first and headed West. On hearing the enemy was occupying Tulagi, Task Force 17 attacked the landing beaches, sinking several small ships before rejoining Lexington and an Australian cruiser force under Rear Admiral John Gregory Crace on May 5.

The next day, intelligence reported a Japanese invasion task force headed for Port Moresby, New Guinea, and a carrier strike force was in the area. The morning of May 7, Fletcher sent the Australian cruisers to stop the transports while he sought the carriers. That same day, Japanese carrier planes of Rear Admiral Chuichi Hara found the American tanker . Believing they had found a carrier, they severely damaged her after several all-out attacks, and sank her escorting destroyer, ; on May 11,  located her, rescued the surviving crew, and sank her by naval gunfire.

On May 8, at first light, "round three opened." Fletcher launched seventy-five aircraft, Hara sixty-nine. Fitch had greater experience in handling air operations, and Fletcher had him direct that function, as he was to do again later with Noyes at Guadalcanal.  was hit, but not damaged below waterline; it slunk away.  had earlier dodged under a squall. The Japanese attack put two torpedoes into Lexington, which was abandoned that evening. Yorktown was hit near her island, but survived. Hara failed to use Zuikaku to achieve victory and withdrew. The invasion fleet without air cover, also withdrew, thereby halting the Port Moresby invasion.

Fletcher had achieved the objective of the mission at the cost of a carrier, tanker, and destroyer. In addition, his Grumman F4F Wildcats had beaten Japanese air groups 52 to 35, and had damaged Shōkaku; neither Japanese carrier would be able to join the fight at Midway the following month. This was the first World War II battle in which the Imperial Japanese Navy had been stopped. In battles at Pearl Harbor, the East Indies, Australia, and Ceylon, they had defeated the British, Dutch, and Asiatic Fleets, and had not lost a fleet ship larger than minesweepers and submarines.

Midway: June 4–7, 1942

Vice Admiral William Halsey normally commanded this task force, but became ill and was replaced by Rear Admiral Raymond A. Spruance.

Enterprise and Hornet lost seventy aircraft. Japanese attacks on June 4 severely damaged Yorktown; repairs returned her to the battle until she was hopelessly disabled by a new round of attacks two hours later. At dusk Fletcher released Spruance to continue fighting with Task Force 16 the next day. During the next two days, Spruance found two damaged cruisers and sank one. The enemy transport and battle fleets got away.

A Japanese submarine, found the crippled Yorktown, under tow, on June 5, and sank her along with an adjacent destroyer, . Japan had had seven large carriers—six at the time of the Pearl Harbor attack and one new construction. Four were sunk at Midway. This did not win the war, but evened the odds between Japanese and American fleet carriers.

Landing at Guadalcanal: August 7–9, 1942
As the United States took the offensive in August 1942, Vice Admiral Fletcher commanded Task Force 61 during the invasion of Tulagi and Guadalcanal by the 1st Marine Division. Carrier close air support was provided at Tulagi. The invasion of Guadalcanal was uncontested on the beach. Fletcher requested permission from Admiral Robert L. Ghormley, the overall commander, to withdraw his carriers from dangerous waters when they were no longer needed, claiming that his aircraft losses and fuel state due to maneuvering required him to leave. Fletcher thought that the few U.S. carriers should not be risked against multi-engine, land-based, torpedo bombers, when they were needed for combat against carriers. Fletcher chose to withdraw on the evening of August 8, to prepare for the inevitable Japanese counterattack.

The battle of Savo Island occurred in early morning of August 9, 1942. Allied warships screening the transports were surprised at midnight and defeated in 32 minutes by a Japanese force of seven cruisers and one destroyer, commanded by Japanese Vice Admiral Gunichi Mikawa. One Australian and three U.S. heavy cruisers were sunk, and one other U.S. cruiser and two destroyers were damaged in this lopsided Japanese victory. As Crutchley notes, the transports were not touched. Fletcher is sometimes criticized because his carriers were at the far end of their nightly withdrawal, steaming back for the morning, yet too far away to seek revenge.

Rear Admiral Richmond K. Turner's offloading of supplies did not go as well as expected because of Japanese air raids. He had to withdraw the transports on the evening of August 9, after Fletcher left and most of his cruisers were sunk, over the strenuous objections of the ground commander, Marine General Alexander Vandegrift. The Marines refer to this as the "Navy Bugout", because the reserve Marine regiment and the division's  heavy artillery, much of its ammunition and also most of its medical supplies and rations had yet to be unloaded. The Navy's withdrawal left the Marines ashore initially completely unprotected against Japanese land-based air raids from Rabaul and from nightly shelling by Imperial Japanese Navy cruisers and battleships that came down the "Slot" from their large Naval and air base at Rabaul.

East Solomons: August 24–25, 1942

Fletcher fought a superior Japanese fleet intent on counter-invasion in the aircraft carrier battle of the Eastern Solomons. The ensuing battle was essentially a giant aerial dogfight interspersed with shipborne anti-aircraft fire. The United States lost 20 aircraft; the Japanese lost 70. Enterprise was hit by three bombs; the Japanese seaplane tender  was nearly sunk, but survived. The enemy withdrew without landing troops on Guadalcanal and had to resort to the Tokyo Express: overnight delivery of a few hundred troops and supplies by destroyers.

Fletcher was second-guessed by non-combatants and was criticized by the Chief of Naval Operations, Admiral Ernest King, for not pursuing the Combined Fleet as it withdrew. Fletcher himself suffered a gash to his head in the attack, for which he received the Purple Heart, and was given his first leave after eight months of continuous combat.

Northern
From November 1942 – 1945, Fletcher commanded naval forces in the North Pacific from the Alaskan island of Adak. In November 1942, he became commandant of Thirteenth Naval District and commander of Northwestern Sea Frontier. He was relieved as commandant in October 1943, but continued to serve as commander Northwestern Sea Frontier until April 15, 1944, when the Northwestern Sea Frontier was abolished and the Alaskan Sea Frontier established. He then became Commander of the latter, with additional duty as Commander North Pacific Force and North Pacific Ocean Area.  It was revealed in July 1945, that Task Force 90, under his overall command, had made the first penetration through the Kurile Islands in the Sea of Okhotsk on March 3 and 4, 1945, and the same task force on February 4, 1945, bombarded Paramushir in the first sea bombardment of the Kurile.

Postwar and final days
September 1945, following the cessation of hostilities in the Far East, he proceeded to Ōminato, Japan, with the North Pacific Force (consisting of about sixty vessels) for the emergency naval occupation of Northern Japan. He remained there until ordered to return to the United States, and on December 17, 1945, was appointed to the Navy's General Board. On May 1, 1946, as Senior Member of that Board he became Chairman, and continued to serve in that capacity until relieved of all active duty for his retirement on May 1, 1947, with the rank of full admiral. He retired to his country estate, Araby, in Maryland.

Many of Fletcher's papers were lost in combat. He declined to reconstruct them from Pentagon archives or to be interviewed by Samuel Eliot Morison, who was writing the History of United States Naval Operations in World War II. In return, he received no consideration by Morison, an attitude picked up by later authors.  At least one author felt Fletcher did not get enough credit for forces under his command sinking six Japanese carriers.

Fletcher died on April 25, 1973, four days before his 88th birthday, at the Bethesda Naval Hospital in Bethesda, Maryland. He is buried in Arlington National Cemetery. His widow, Martha Richards Fletcher (born 29 March 1895, at Kansas City, Missouri), whom Fletcher married in February, 1917, died seventeen months later, on 14 September 1974. She was buried next to her husband.

Awards

 Companion, Order of the Bath (Dominion of Canada) (1945)
 Mindanao and Sulu Campaign Medal (Philippine Territory) (1924)
 Order of the Dragon of Annam (French Indochina) (1932)

Medal of Honor citation

Navy Cross citation

Legacy

The 1976 movie Midway depicted Fletcher (played by Robert Webber) as somewhat confused and hesitant during the battle. Charlton Heston, who played a fictional naval officer working with Fletcher, wrote in his personal journals that this portrayal was based on the advice of some Navy veterans critical of Fletcher, and he said he and Webber tried to make it as subtle as possible.

See also

 List of Medal of Honor recipients
 List of Medal of Honor recipients (Veracruz)

References

Further reading

External links

 
 
 Burial Detail: Fletcher, Frank J – ANC Explorer
 The Frank Jack Fletcher papers at the American Heritage Center

1885 births
1973 deaths

United States Navy admirals
United States Navy personnel of World War I
Battle of Veracruz (1914) recipients of the Medal of Honor
Battle of Midway
Burials at Arlington National Cemetery
Naval War College alumni
People from Marshalltown, Iowa
Recipients of the Navy Cross (United States)
Recipients of the Navy Distinguished Service Medal
United States Naval Academy alumni
United States Navy Medal of Honor recipients
United States Navy World War II admirals
Military personnel from Iowa